ET bel Arabi was launched as TV show  Arabic language entertainment  newsmagazine based on the format of the American newsmagazine Entertainment Tonight. It is jointly produced by CBS Television Distribution and MBC Group

The  was show is hosted by Mariam Saïd, Badr Al Zaidan, Nadrin Faraj.

In 2019, ET بالعربي was launched online where viewers can now watch it online and follow its social media platforms.

External links
 

2015 television series debuts
2017 television series endings
Arabic-language television shows
Entertainment news shows
Television series by CBS Studios
Non-American television series based on American television series